The 2019 Nigerian House of Representatives elections in Rivers State was held on February 23, 2019, to elect members of the House of Representatives to represent Rivers State, Nigeria.

Overview

Summary

Results

Abua/Odua/Ahoada East
A total of 8 candidates registered with the Independent National Electoral Commission to contest in the election. PDP candidate Solomon Bob won the election, defeating Omar Alfred Innocent of SDP and other party candidates.

Ahoada West/Ogba/Egbema/Ndoni
A total of 10 candidates registered with the Independent National Electoral Commission to contest in the election. PDP candidate Nnam Obi Prince Uchechuku won the election, defeating Godstime Ogbom Akaraka of Accord and  other party candidates.

Akuku Toru/Asari Toru
A total of 15 candidates registered with the Independent National Electoral Commission to contest in the election. PDP candidate Boma Goodhead won the election, defeating Amachere Ibinabo Sonny of APGA and  other party candidates.

Andoni Opobo/Nkoro
A total of  candidates registered with the Independent National Electoral Commission to contest in the election. PDP candidate Awaji Inomeek Abiante won the election, defeating Dandison Jude of SDC and  other party candidates.

Degema/Bonny
A total of 11 candidates registered with the Independent National Electoral Commission to contest in the election. PDP candidate Dagogo Doctor Festus won the election, defeating Inye Harry Marshal of Accord and  other party candidates.

Eleme/Oyigbo/Tai
A total of 12 candidates registered with the Independent National Electoral Commission to contest in the election. PDP candidate Chisom Promise Dike won the election, defeating Nnamdi Ihute David of Accord and  other party candidates.

Etche/Omuma
A total of 12 candidates registered with the Independent National Electoral Commission to contest in the election. PDP candidate Ephraim Nwuzu won the election.

Ikwerre/Emoha
A total of 16 candidates registered with the Independent National Electoral Commission to contest in the election. PDP candidate Emerengwa Boniface Sunday won the election, defeating Amadi Chidi Eleonu of APGA and  other party candidates.

Khana/Gokana
A total of 23 candidates registered with the Independent National Electoral Commission to contest in the election. PDP candidate Dumnmene Robison Dekor won the election, defeating Anyie Innocent of ZLP and  other party candidates.

Obio/Akpor
A total of 9 candidates registered with the Independent National Electoral Commission to contest in the election. PDP candidate Chida Kingsley Ogundu won the election, defeating Gboms King Tony of Accord and  other party candidates.

Okrika/Ogu/Bolo
A total of 11 candidates registered with the Independent National Electoral Commission to contest in the election. PDP candidate Gogo Bright Tamuno won the election, defeating Gracetiti Fredson of GPN and other party candidates.

Port Harcourt 1
A total of 9 candidates registered with the Independent National Electoral Commission to contest in the election. PDP candidate Kenneth Anayo Chikere won the election, defeating Tonye Rex Idaminabo of ADC and  other party candidates.

Port Harcourt 2
A total of 7 candidates registered with the Independent National Electoral Commission to contest in the election. PDP candidate Igwe Chinyere Emmanuel won the election, defeating Emmanuel Amadichukwu of Accord and  other party candidates.

References 

Rivers State House of Representatives elections
2019 Rivers State elections
2019 Nigerian House of Representatives elections
February 2019 events in Nigeria